Returning Home is a 2015 Norwegian drama film directed by Henrik Martin Dahlsbakken. It was one of three films shortlisted by Norway to be their submission for the Academy Award for Best Foreign Language Film at the 88th Academy Awards, but it lost out to The Wave.

The film received several reviews with "die throws" of 4 in Dagsavisen, Bergensavisen, and 3 in VG, Aftenposten, and Dagbladet.

Å vende tilbake was previously the Norwegian title of Pedro Almodóvar's film Volver.

Cast
 Åsmund Høeg as Oscar
 Fredrik Grøndahl as Fredrik
 Ingar Helge Gimle as Einar
 Lia Boysen as Anna
 Isabel Christine Andreasen as Mari

References

External links
 

2015 films
2015 drama films
Norwegian drama films
2010s Norwegian-language films